The FA Cup 1969–70 is the 89th season of the world's oldest football knockout competition; The Football Association Challenge Cup, or FA Cup for short. The large number of clubs entering the tournament from lower down the English football league system meant that the competition started with a number of preliminary and qualifying rounds. The 30 victorious teams from the Fourth Round Qualifying progressed to the First Round Proper.

Preliminary round

Ties

Replays

2nd replay

1st qualifying round

Ties

Replays

2nd replays

2nd qualifying round

Ties

Replays

2nd replay

3rd qualifying round

Ties

Replays

4th qualifying round
The teams that given byes to this round are Leytonstone, Wimbledon, Yeovil Town, Hereford United, South Shields, Chelmsford City, Weymouth, Grantham, Altrincham, Kidderminster Harriers, Nuneaton Borough, Oxford City, Barnet, Macclesfield Town, Tow Law Town, Kettering Town, Margate, Brentwood Town, Morecambe, Bangor City, Goole Town, Skelmersdale United, Cheltenham Town and Dartford.

Ties

Replays

2nd replays

1969–70 FA Cup
See 1969-70 FA Cup for details of the rounds from the First Round Proper onwards.

External links
 Football Club History Database: FA Cup 1969–70
 FA Cup Past Results

Qualifying Rounds
FA Cup qualifying rounds